Corby Bridge (also known as Wetheral Viaduct to distinguish it from the nearby Corby Viaduct) is a railway viaduct adjacent to and immediately east of Wetheral railway station at Wetheral, near Carlisle, in north-western England, begun in 1830 and completed in 1834.

Background
The idea of linking Newcastle upon Tyne on England's east coast with Carlisle on the west dates back to at least the 1770s, when proposals were tabled for a canal. The prospectus for the Newcastle & Carlisle Railway was published in 1825 and construction work began in 1829 under the supervision of Francis Giles. The line was one of the earliest mainline railways and Britain's first major east-west line. 

Giles was the consulting engineer for the entire line but was also directly responsible for the principal works at the western end, which presented some of the greatest engineering challenges on the route, including Corby Bridge and Corby Viaduct immediately to the east, and the Gelt Bridge further along the line. The bridge is named as "Corby Bridge" on Ordnance Survey maps but widely known as "Wetheral Viaduct".

Description
The bridge consists of five semi-circular arches, supported by six piers—two in the river bed and two on each bank. It still carries the double-track Tyne Valley Line, and includes a footbridge connecting Wetheral with Great Corby. The footbridge is supported on cantilevers attached to the north face of the main bridge, parallel to the parapet. The walkway consists of wooden planks and has Gothic-style iron railings on the far side; it is approached from the road via 93 steps.

At the western end of the parapets is a plaque on each side, one in English and one in Latin, which reads "In testimony of respect for their late colleague Henry Howard Esq., who, on 25 March 1830, laid the foundation stone of this bridge, the directors of the railway place this tablet."

History
Construction of the viaduct began in 1830 and took four years to complete; it opened on 12 August 1834. The works were carried out by the contractor, William S. Denton.

The footbridge was added to the north face in 1851 to provide a route across the river for pedestrians and deter them from trespassing on track bed. Initially, a half-penny toll was charged, having risen to a penny by the time the station closed in 1956 (train services resumed in 1981). Pedestrian passage is now free. The footbridge was designed by P. Tate, engineer, and built by C.D. Richardson, the contractor, whose names are inscribed on foundation stones.

The Corby Bridge Inn was opened nearby in the same year as the viaduct to provide accommodation for railway travellers and named for the viaduct. The inn is mentioned in Scott's Railway Companion, a guide to the Newcastle & Carlisle route, published in 1838. It is a grade II listed building. Gordon Biddle, a railway historian, described the viaduct as "much larger and more imposing" than other structures on the route. It is a grade I listed building. Its list entry describes it as "a major and early railway viaduct, forming an important landscape feature in an area of outstanding natural beauty".

See also

Grade I listed buildings in Cumbria
Listed buildings in Wetheral

Gallery

References 

Railway viaducts in Cumbria
Toll bridges in England
History of Cumbria
1834 establishments in England
Pedestrian bridges in England
Bridges completed in 1834
Grade I listed buildings in Cumbria
Wetheral
Grade I listed railway bridges and viaducts